Hannibal Navies (born July 19, 1977) is a former American football player in the NFL. Hannibal was a third-team All Big 12 selection at the University of Colorado and earned the team’s defensive player of the year award after starting every game at linebacker. He was drafted in the 1999 NFL Draft by the Carolina Panthers, then played for the Green Bay Packers.  In 2005, he signed with the Cincinnati Bengals where he started 15 games. Navies was cut in training camp a year later. He was signed by the San Francisco 49ers on November 22, 2006, but was cut to make room for Zak Keasey in 2007.

Hannibal is an alumnus of Berkeley High School in Berkeley, California, and runs a football camp called 360 Football Academy that prepares students to become collegiate scholar athletes.

External links
 360 Football Academy

1977 births
Living people
American football linebackers
Cincinnati Bengals players
Carolina Panthers players
Green Bay Packers players
San Francisco 49ers players
Colorado Buffaloes football players
Berkeley High School (Berkeley, California) alumni